Adriano Bertaccini (born 13 August 2000) is a Belgian professional footballer who plays as a forward for Belgian National Division 1 club Thes.

Career statistics

Club

Notes

References

2000 births
Living people
Sportspeople from Charleroi
Footballers from Hainaut (province)
Belgian footballers
Belgium youth international footballers
Association football forwards
R. Charleroi S.C. players
Standard Liège players
Club Brugge KV players
K.R.C. Genk players
K.M.S.K. Deinze players
SC Austria Lustenau players
K.V.V. Thes Sport Tessenderlo players
2. Liga (Austria) players
Belgian expatriate footballers
Belgian expatriate sportspeople in Austria
Expatriate footballers in Austria